Benakis is a surname. Notable people with the surname include:

Antonis Benakis (1873–1954), Greek art collector
Emmanouil Benakis (1843–1929), Greek merchant and politician
Linos Benakis (1928-2022), Greek historian
Panagiotis Benakis ( 1700–1771), Greek freedom-fighter